Lauderdale County is a county located on the eastern border of the U.S. state of Mississippi. As of the 2020 census, the population was 72,984. The county seat is Meridian. The county is named for Colonel James Lauderdale, who was killed at the Battle of New Orleans in the War of 1812. Lauderdale County is included in the Meridian, MS Micropolitan Statistical Area.

History
An early explorer Sam Dale died in the county and is buried in Daleville, and a large monument is placed at his burial site. Andrew Jackson traveled through the county on his way to New Orleans and a town was named Hickory after his nickname "Old Hickory". 

The largest city in the county is Meridian, which was in important railway intersection during the early 20th century. It was also home to the Soule Steam Feed Works which manufactured steam engines. Logging and rail transport were important early industries in the county. One of the largest waterfalls in Mississippi, Dunns Falls, is located in the county and a water driven mill still exists on the site. Lauderdale county is also home to the headquarters of Peavey Electronics which has manufactured audio and music equipment for half a century.

Like much of the post-Reconstruction South the county has a checkered racial history with 16 documented lynchings in the period from 1877 to 1950; most occurred around the turn of the 20th century.

Geography

Major highways
  Interstate 59
  Interstate 20
  U.S. Highway 11
  U.S. Highway 45
  U.S. Highway 80
  Mississippi Highway 19
  Mississippi Highway 39

Adjacent counties
 Kemper County (north)
 Sumter County, Alabama (east)
 Choctaw County, Alabama (southeast)
 Clarke County (south)
 Newton County (west)

Demographics

2020 census

As of the 2020 United States Census, there were 72,984 people, 29,367 households, and 19,612 families residing in the county.

2000 census
As of the census of 2000, there were 78,161 people, 29,990 households, and 20,573 families residing in the county.  The population density was 111 people per square mile (43/km2).  There were 33,418 housing units at an average density of 48 per square mile (18/km2).  The racial makeup of the county was 60.15% White, 38.18% Black or African American, 0.18% Native American, 0.50% Asian, 0.03% Pacific Islander, 0.34% from other races, and 0.63% from two or more races.  1.14% of the population were Hispanic or Latino of any race.

There were 29,990 households, out of which 33.90% had children under the age of 18 living with them, 46.70% were married couples living together, 18.30% had a female householder with no husband present, and 31.40% were non-families. 28.00% of all households were made up of individuals, and 11.70% had someone living alone who was 65 years of age or older.  The average household size was 2.49 and the average family size was 3.06.

In the county, the population was spread out, with 26.60% under the age of 18, 9.80% from 18 to 24, 28.00% from 25 to 44, 21.40% from 45 to 64, and 14.20% who were 65 years of age or older.  The median age was 35 years. For every 100 females there were 90.60 males.  For every 100 females age 18 and over, there were 85.50 males.

The median income for a household in the county was $30,768, and the median income for a family was $37,581. Males had a median income of $31,069 versus $21,111 for females. The per capita income for the county was $16,026.  About 17.10% of families and 20.80% of the population were below the poverty line, including 28.80% of those under age 18 and 18.80% of those age 65 or over.

2015
As of 2015 the largest self-identified ancestry groups in Lauderdale County, Mississippi are:
 English - 9.3%
 Irish - 8.9%
 American - 8.0%
 German - 5.9%
 Scottish - 2.1%
 Scots-Irish - 1.7%
 Italian - 1.2%
 French (except Basque) - 1.1%
 French-Canadian - 0.6%

Government and infrastructure
The East Mississippi Correctional Facility is located in an unincorporated area of the county, near Meridian. Intended to provide intensive treatment for up to 1500 state prisoners who are mentally ill, it has been operated since 2012 by Management and Training Corporation under contract to the Mississippi Department of Corrections. In 2013 the ACLU and Southern Poverty Law Center filed a class-action suit against the state and MTC for poor conditions at the facility. The court granted the plaintiffs class certification in 2015, allowing the case to proceed. The former for-profit contractor, GEO Group, was forced out of its contracts for this and two other state facilities in 2012 as a result of settlement of a class-action suit for its poor management of the Walnut Grove Youth Correctional Facility.

Education
Lauderdale County is within the service area of the East Mississippi Community College system. The system offers classes at the Naval Air Station Meridian Extension in Meridian.
Other academic institutions are Meridian Community College, and Mississippi State University Meridian Campus.

Communities

Cities
 Meridian (county seat and largest municipality)

Towns
 Marion

Census-designated places
 Collinsville
 Lauderdale
 Meridian Station
 Nellieburg
 Toomsuba

Unincorporated communities
 Alamucha
 Bailey
 Daleville
 Increase
 Kewanee
 Lizelia
 Meehan
 Point
 Russell
 Savoy
 Whynot
 Zero

Notable people
 Samuel Dale (1772–1841), American frontiersman, known as the "Daniel Boone of Alabama" and a veteran of the Creek War of 1813–14.  In 1836, Dale was elected as Lauderdale County's first representative in the Mississippi state legislature.

See also

 National Register of Historic Places listings in Lauderdale County, Mississippi

References

External links
 Lauderdale County, MS
 Meridian/Lauderdale County Tourism Bureau
 Laurerdale County Courthouse Pictures

 
Mississippi counties
County in Meridian micropolitan area
1833 establishments in Mississippi
Populated places established in 1833